Olivier lo Templier (fl. 1269) was a Knight Templar and troubadour probably from Catalonia. He appears as lo templier En'Olivier in one chansonnier, in which is preserved his only known work, Estat aurai lonc temps en pessamen ("I have been worrying for a long time"). He may be identical with Ramon Oliver who appears as commander of the Templar house of Gardeny near Lleida in 1295. He should not be confused with another troubadour Templar, Ricaut Bonomel, whose style was very different and who wrote from the Holy Land.

Olivier's canso de crozada (crusade song) can be dated precisely because of its reference to the Crusader fleet which left Barcelona with King James I of Aragon at its head in 1269. Olivier wrote the song to James, of whom he was hearty supporter, and the barons of Catalonia praising their courage even after they were forced to abort their expedition. His goal was to convince James to set out once again to recover the Church of the Holy Sepulchre. Linda Paterson translates lines 17–24:

Olivier's Catalan identity can only be posited on the internal evidence of his canso, the last line of which mentions the lord of Gelida, Guerau de Cervelló, with whom Olivier may have had links. There is also evidence of Catalanism in his declension, but this may be attributable to the copyist(s) and not Olivier. His affection for James, too, cannot be taken as evidence of Catalan identity in and of itself.

Sources

13th-century people from the Kingdom of Aragon
13th-century Spanish troubadours
Medieval Knights Templar members
Medieval writers about the Crusades
Year of death unknown
Year of birth unknown